Adhanur  is a village in the Needamangalam taluk of Tiruvarur district in Tamil Nadu, India.

Demographics 

 census, Adhanur had a population of 2,777 with 1,466 males and 1,311 females. The sex ratio was 894. The literacy rate was 77.73.

References 

 

Villages in Tiruvarur district